This is a list of notable events in country music that took place in the year 1941.

Events 
 January 1 – Radio programmers begin a 10-month ban on the ASCAP catalog when they fail to reach an agreement. Instead, disc jockeys begin to rely on BMI and its catalog of "hillbilly" music.
 October – The Grand Ole Opry organizes a "Camel Country" tour in a show of support for American servicemen, many of whom would be off to war two months later.

Top Hillbilly (Country) Recordings

The following songs achieved the highest positions in Billboard magazine's 'Best Sellers in Stores' chart, monthly 'Hillbilly Hits' chart, supplemented by 'Joel Whitburn's Pop Memories 1890-1954' and record sales reported on the "Discography of American Historical Recordings" website, and other sources as specified, during 1941. Numerical rankings are approximate.

Births 
 January 18 – Bobby Goldsboro, middle-of-the-road artist best known for 1968's "Honey."
 February 8 – Henson Cargill, best known for 1968's "Skip a Rope" (died 2007).
 March 28 – Charlie McCoy, harmonica specialist.
 April 2 – Sonny Throckmorton, songwriter.
 May 31 – Johnny Paycheck, outlaw country-styled singer best known for "Take This Job and Shove It" (died 2003).
 June 8 — Alf Robertson, Swedish country musician (died 2008).
 August 14 – Connie Smith, female vocalist who grew to fame in the 1960s; Grand Ole Opry mainstay.
 September 21 – Dickey Lee, pop-country singer-songwriter.
 September 26 – David Frizzell, brother of Lefty Frizzell who grew into a country star in his own right.
 October 17 – Earl Thomas Conley, singer-songwriter who became one of country's biggest stars of the 1980s (died 2019).
 November 6 – Guy Clark, alternative-outlaw country singer-songwriter (died 2016).
 November 27 – Eddie Rabbitt, singer-songwriter who crossed over to pop in the early 1980s with hits such as "I Love a Rainy Night" and "Drivin' My Life Away" (died 1998).
 November 29 – Jody Miller, female vocalist best known for "Queen of the House" (answer song to Roger Miller's "King of the Road").

Deaths 
 November 7 – Henry Whitter, 49, early country musician.

Further reading 
 Kingsbury, Paul, "Vinyl Hayride: Country Music Album Covers 1947–1989," Country Music Foundation, 2003
 Millard, Bob, "Country Music: 70 Years of America's Favorite Music," HarperCollins, New York, 1993
 Whitburn, Joel. "Joel Whitburn's Pop Memories 1890–1954: The History of American Popular Music," Record Research Inc., Menomonee Falls, Wisconsin, 1986.

References

Country
Country music by year